The women's 200 metre individual medley competition of the swimming events at the 1979 Pan American Games took place on 2 July at the Piscina Olimpica Del Escambron. The last Pan American Games champion was Kathy Heddy of the United States.

This race consisted of four lengths of the pool, one each in backstroke, breaststroke, butterfly and freestyle swimming.

Results
All times are shown in minutes and seconds.

Heats
The first round was held on July 2.

Final 
The final was held on July 2.

References

Swimming at the 1979 Pan American Games
Pan